Lyneham Longbarrow is a long barrow near Lyneham, Oxfordshire. It is beside the A361 road, between Shipton-under-Wychwood and Chipping Norton. Just nine metres from the barrow mound stands a 1.8 metre tall standing stone.

Description
Lyneham barrow stands on a ridge overlooking valleys to the northwest and southeast. The long barrow mound is 52 metres long, 19 metres wide and stands up to 1.75 metres high. Next to it is a weathered sandstone megalith 1.8 metres in height above ground level, 2.0 metres in width and 0.5 metres thick. The stone may have been part of a facade of standing stones.

Excavations
The barrow was excavated in 1894. The excavations located two chambers on the southeast side of the mound and at least one of these contained bone fragments, pottery and charcoal. Also found were two Anglo-Saxon burials which had been cut into the top of the existing mound.

Notes

Megalithic monuments in England
Stone Age sites in England
Archaeological sites in Oxfordshire
Buildings and structures in Oxfordshire
Tourist attractions in Oxfordshire